Palette Town was a shopping mall and entertainment complex in Odaiba, Tokyo, Japan. The facilities have been closed for redevelopment of the area.

Features
Features included:
 Daikanransha, a Ferris wheel
 Mega Web, exhibition hall of car maker Toyota
 Mori Building Digital Art Museum: Epson teamLab "Borderless"
 Tokyo Leisure Land, 24-hour video gaming, karaoke, bowling
 VenusFort, a Venice-themed shopping mall

See also

 List of shopping malls in Japan

References

External links

1999 establishments in Japan
2022 disestablishments in Japan
Defunct shopping malls
Odaiba
Shopping centres in Japan
Buildings and structures in Koto, Tokyo
Shopping malls established in 1999
Shopping malls disestablished in 2022